Ricardo Farro (born 6 March 1985) is a Peruvian footballer who plays for Melgar in the Torneo Descentralizado, as a goalkeeper.

Club career
Farro started out his career with Alianza Lima in 2003.

In 2005, he joined newly formed Lima club Universidad San Martín. There he won his first league title winning the 2007 Torneo Descentralizado and the following year 2008 Torneo Descentralizado.  He helped his side win their third title by finishing as the 2010 Torneo Descentralizado champions, making 12 league appearances and 2 in the final playoffs that season.

Honours
Universidad San Martín
 Torneo Descentralizado (3): 2007, 2008, 2010

References

External links

1985 births
Living people
Footballers from Lima
Peruvian footballers
Peruvian Primera División players
Club Alianza Lima footballers
Club Deportivo Universidad de San Martín de Porres players
Real Garcilaso footballers
Cusco FC footballers
Association football goalkeepers
Deportivo Binacional FC players
FBC Melgar footballers